Fauve Software was founded in 1992 by brothers Fred and Richard Krueger. It developed Matisse, a natural medium paint program, and XRes, a high-end image-manipulation program that was the basis for Macromedia Fireworks. 

It was acquired by Macromedia in 1995.

References 

Defunct software companies of the United States
Software companies established in 1992
Technology companies disestablished in 1995